The 2016 Virginia Cavaliers baseball team represented the University of Virginia during the 2016 NCAA Division I baseball season. The Cavaliers played their home games at Davenport Field as a member of the Atlantic Coast Conference. They were led by head coach Brian O'Connor, in his 13th season at Virginia. The 2015 team won the National Championship, their first in school history.

Previous season
In 2015, the Cavaliers finished the season 2nd in the ACC's Coastal Division with a record of 33–19, 15–15 in conference play. They qualified for the 2015 Atlantic Coast Conference baseball tournament by winning a play in game against Georgia Tech, and were eliminated in pool play, losing all three . They qualified for the 2015 NCAA Division I baseball tournament unseeded and were placed in the Lake Elsinore Regional, hosted by UC Santa Barbara. Also in the regional were UC Santa Barbara, San Diego State, and USC. The Cavaliers defeated USC, 6–1, in the opening game, and USC, 3–1, to advance to the regional final. There, they again defeated USC, this time by a score of 14–10 in 11 innings. the Super Regional was hosted by the Cavaliers in Charlottesville. There Cavaliers defeated Maryland, 5–3 and 5–4, defeating Maryland in a super regional for the second year in a row,  to advance to the College World Series.

In the College World Series, Virginia's first game was against Arkansas, whom the Cavaliers defeated, 5–3. In the second round, Virginia defeated #4 national seed Florida, 1–0. In the semifinals, the Cavaliers lost to Florida, 10–5, but bounced back in the second game, winning 5–4. The Cavaliers advanced to the College World Series finals to play Vanderbilt, a rematch of the 2014 world series. In the first game of the finals, the Commodores won by a score of 5–1. Virginia then rebounded to defeat Vanderbilt, 3–0, in game two. In a winner-take-all game three, Virginia prevailed, 4–2, to be crowned national champions. Josh Sborz was named the College World Series Most Outstanding Player recording three wins and a save in four games; pitching 13 scoreless innings with 10 strikeouts, four walks and seven hits allowed.

Personnel

Roster

Coaching staff

Schedule

! style="background:#00214E;color:white;"| Regular Season
|- valign="top" 

|- bgcolor="#bbffbb"
| February 19 || vs  || #9 || Pelicans Ballpark • Myrtle Beach, SC || 8–6 || Jones (1–0) || Lauer (0–1) || Bettinger (1) || || 1–0 || 
|- bgcolor="#bbffbb"
| February 20 || vs  || #9 || Pelicans Ballpark • Myrtle Beach, SC || 8–0 || Lynch (1–0) || Seth (0–1) ||  || 850 || 2–0 ||
|- bgcolor="#ffbbbb"
| February 21 || at Coastal Carolina || #9 || Pelicans Ballpark • Myrtle Beach, SC || 5–4 || Beckwith (1–0) || Bettinger (0–1) || || 3136 || 2–1 ||
|- bgcolor="#bbffbb"
| February 23 ||  || #9 || Davenport Field • Charlottesville, VA || 18–1 || Haseley (1–0) || Gorman (0–1) || || 3105 || 3–1 ||
|- bgcolor="#ffbbbb"
| February 26 ||  || #9 || Davenport Field • Charlottesville, VA || 8–5 || Ingle (1–0) || Bettinger (0–2) ||  || 3351 || 3–2 ||
|- bgcolor="#ffbbbb"
| February 27 || East Carolina || #9 || Davenport Field • Charlottesville, VA || 6–1 || Jacob (2–0) || Lynch (1–1) || Durazo (1)  || 3669 || 3–3 ||
|- bgcolor="#bbffbb"
| February 28 || East Carolina || #9 || Davenport Field • Charlottesville, VA || 4–2 || Doyle (1–0) || Boyd (1–1) || Bettinger (2)  || 3993 || 4–3 ||
|-

|- bgcolor="#bbffbb"
| March 1 ||  || #15 || Davenport Field • Charlottesville, VA || 6–2 || Haseley (2–0) || Sheehan (0–2) ||  || 3105 || 5–3 ||
|- bgcolor="#bbffbb"
| March 4 ||  || #15 || Davenport Field • Charlottesville, VA || 4–2 || Jones (2–0) || Trimarco (1–1) || Bettinger(3) || 3092 || 6–3 || 
|- bgcolor="#bbffbb"
| March 5 || Monmouth || #15 || Davenport Field • Charlottesville, VA || 11–1011  || Sousa (1–0) || Brambilla (0–1) ||  || 3399 || 7–3  || 
|- bgcolor="#ffbbbb"
| March 6 || Monmouth || #15 || Davenport Field • Charlottesville, VA || 4–6 || Dennis (1–1) || Doyle (1–1) || Andrews (1) || 3321 || 7–4 || 
|- bgcolor="#bbffbb"
| March 8 ||  || #15 || Davenport Field • Charlottesville, VA || 6–2 || Haseley (3–0) || Adams (0–2) ||  || 3071 || 8–4 || 
|- bgcolor="#bbffbb"
| March 9 || Wagner || #15 || Davenport Field • Charlottesville, VA || 20–7 || Rosenberger (1–0) || Abbatiello (0–1) ||  || 3149 || 9–4 || 
|- bgcolor="#bbffbb"
| March 11 || at  || #15 || Durham Bulls Athletic Park • Durham, NC || 6–0 || Jones (3–0) || Clark (2–1) ||  || 632 || 10–4 || 1–0
|- bgcolor="#bbffbb"
| March 12 || at Duke|| #15 || Durham Bulls Athletic Park • Durham, NC || 7–6 || Shambora (1–0) || Stallings (0–1) || Bettinger (4) || 906 || 11–4 || 2–0
|- bgcolor="#ffbbbb"
| March 13 || at Duke|| #15 || Durham Bulls Athletic Park • Durham, NC || 0–3 || McAfee (2–1) || Doyle (1–2) ||  || 533 || 11–5 || 2–1
|- bgcolor="#bbffbb"
| March 15 ||  || #14 || Davenport Field • Charlottesville, VA || 2–1 || Haseley (4–0) || Morris (0–1) || Bettinger (5) || 2949 || 12–5 || 
|- bgcolor="#bbffbb"
| March 16 || Towson || #14 || Davenport Field • Charlottesville, VA || 10–8 || Sousa (2–0) || Stricker (2–1) || Bettinger (6) || 3072 || 13–5 || 
|- bgcolor="#bbffbb"
| March 18 ||  || #14 || Davenport Field • Charlottesville, VA || 4–0 || Jones (4–0) || Dunshee (3–2) ||  || 3488 || 14–5 || 3–1
|- bgcolor="#bbffbb"
| March 18 || Wake Forest || #14 || Davenport Field • Charlottesville, VA || 6–4 || Shambora (2–0) || McCarren (2–1) ||  || 3453 || 15–5 || 4–1
|- bgcolor="#ffbbbb"
| March 19 || Wake Forest || #14 || Davenport Field • Charlottesville, VA || 8–9 || Sellers (2–1) || Bettinger (0–3) ||  || 3686 || 15–6 || 4–2
|- bgcolor="#bbffbb"
| March 22 ||  || #16 || Davenport Field • Charlottesville, VA || 15–6 || Haseley (5–0) || Taylor ||  || 3384 || 16–6 || 
|- bgcolor="#bbffbb"
| March 25 || at #7  || #16 || Jim Patterson Stadium • Louisville, KY || 6–3 || Jones (5–0) || Funkhouser (2–2) || Bettinger (7) || 2667 || 17–6 || 5–2
|- bgcolor="#ffbbbb"
| March 26 || at #7 Louisville || #16 || Jim Patterson Stadium • Louisville, KY || 4–11 || McKay (5–1) || Lynch (1–2) ||  || 3334 || 17–7 || 5–3
|- bgcolor="#ffbbbb"
| March 27 || at #7 Louisville || #16 || Jim Patterson Stadium • Louisville, KY || 0–15 || Harrington (5–1) || Doyle (1–3) ||  || 2024 || 17–8 || 5–4
|- bgcolor="#ffbbbb"
| March 29 ||  || #21 || Davenport Field • Charlottesville, VA || 4–5 || Bailey (2–0) || Bettinger (0–4) || Smith (1) || 3383 || 17–9 || 
|-

|- bgcolor="#ffbbbb"
| April 1 || #22  || #21 || Davenport Field • Charlottesville, VA || 7–8 || Staley (1–1) || Jones (5–1) || DeJuneas (5)|| 3927 || 17–10 || 5–5
|- bgcolor="#bbffbb"
| April 2 || #22 NC State || #21 || Davenport Field • Charlottesville, VA || 5–3 || Haseley (6–0) || Brown (3–1) ||  || 4300 || 18–10 || 6–5
|- bgcolor="#ffbbbb"
| April 3 || #22 NC State || #21 || Davenport Field • Charlottesville, VA || 2–5 || Williamson (5–0) || Doyle (1–4) || Gilbert (3) || 3874 || 18–11 || 6–6
|- bgcolor="#ffbbbb"
| April 5 || at VCU || #26 || The Diamond • Richmond, VA || 5–7 || Ebersole (3–2) || Lynch (1–3) ||  || 3028 || 18–12 || 
|- bgcolor="#bbffbb"
| April 6 ||  || #26 || Davenport Field • Charlottesville, VA || 15–3 || Rosenberger (2–0) || Sheinkop (1–3) ||  || 3097 || 19–12 || 
|- bgcolor="#bbffbb"
| April 8 || at  || #26 || Eddie Pellagrini Diamond at John Shea Field • Chestnut Hill, MA || 3–0 || Jones (6–1) || Stevens (2–1) ||  || 230 || 20–12 || 7–6
|- bgcolor="#ffbbbb"
| April 9 || at Boston College || #26 || Eddie Pellagrini Diamond at John Shea Field • Chestnut Hill, MA || 1–2 || Adams (3–3) || Doyle (1–5) ||  || 519 || 20–13 || 7–7
|- bgcolor="#ffbbbb"
| April 10 || at Boston College || #26 || Eddie Pellagrini Diamond at John Shea Field • Chestnut Hill, MA || 4–513 || Adams (4–3) || Harrington (0–1) ||  || 412 || 20–14 || 7–8
|- bgcolor="#bbffbb"
| April 13 ||  ||  || Davenport Field • Charlottesville, VA || 9–4 || Shambora (3–0) || Gould (1–1) ||  || 3055 || 21–14 || 
|- bgcolor="#bbffbb"
| April 15 || #21  ||  || Davenport Field • Charlottesville, VA || 7–4 || Jones (7–1) || Gallen (4–3) || Doyle (1) || 3933 || 22–14 || 8–8
|- bgcolor="#ffbbbb"
| April 16 || #21 North Carolina ||  || Davenport Field • Charlottesville, VA || 1–8 || Bukauskas (6–1) || Haseley (6–1) ||  || 4975 || 22–15 || 8–9
|- bgcolor="#bbffbb"
| April 17 || #21 North Carolina ||  || Davenport Field • Charlottesville, VA || 15–9 || Doherty (1–0) || Bogucki (2–2) ||  || 4950 || 23–15 || 9–9
|- bgcolor="#bbffbb"
| April 19 ||  || #20 || Davenport Field • Charlottesville, VA || 11–3 || Sousa (3–0) || Swarmer (2–3) || Shambora (1) || 3264 || 24–15 || 
|- bgcolor="#ffbbbb"
| April 20 || VCU || #20 || Davenport Field • Charlottesville, VA || 5–11 || Crabb (2–0) || Doherty (1–1) ||  || 3345 || 24–16 || 
|- bgcolor="#bbffbb"
| April 22 || at #1 Miami (FL) || #20 || Mark Light Field at Alex Rodriguez Park • Coral Gables, FL || 6–5 || Jones (8–1) || Woodrey (4–3) || Doyle (1) || 3015 || 25–16 || 10–9
|- bgcolor="#ffbbbb"
| April 23 || at #1 Miami (FL) || #20 || Mark Light Field at Alex Rodriguez Park • Coral Gables, FL || 2–9 || Mediavilla (7–1) || Haseley (6–2) ||  || 4099 || 25–17 || 10–10
|- bgcolor="#bbffbb"
| April 24 || at #1 Miami (FL) || #20 || Mark Light Field at Alex Rodriguez Park • Coral Gables, FL || 7–3 || Bettinger (1–4) || Garcia (6–3) || Doyle (2) || 2837 || 26–17 || 11–10
|- bgcolor="#bbffbb"
| April 26 || at Old Dominion || #16 || Harbor Park • Norfolk, VA || 8–4 || Shambora (4–0) || Hartman (4–4) || Doherty (1) || 4826 || 27–17 || 
|- bgcolor="#bbffbb"
| April 30 || at  || #16 || Petersen Sports Complex • Pittsburgh, PA || 5–1 || Jones (9–1) || Zeuch (5–1) ||  || 718 || 28–17 || 12–10
|- bgcolor="#bbffbb"
| April 30 || at Pittsburgh || #16 || Petersen Sports Complex • Pittsburgh, PA || 7–6 || Harrington (1–1) || Chentouf (0–1) || Doyle (3) || 718 || 29–17 || 13–10
|-

|- bgcolor="#bbffbb"
| May 1 || at Pittsburgh || #16 || Petersen Sports Complex • Pittsburgh, PA || 9–1 || Haseley (7–2) || Garbee (1–3) ||  || 318 || 30–17 || 14–10
|- bgcolor="#bbffbb"
| May 3 || at  || #11 || Liberty Baseball Stadium • Lynchburg, VA || 7–3 || Shambora (5–0) || Clouse (3–2) ||  || 4024 || 31–17 ||
|- bgcolor="#bbffbb"
| May 13 || #22  || #11 || Davenport Field • Charlottesville, VA || 6–3 || Jones (10–1) || Gold (6–3) ||  || 3703 || 32–17 || 15–10
|- bgcolor="#bbffbb"
| May 14 || #22 Georgia Tech || #11 || Davenport Field • Charlottesville, VA || 9–4 || Bettinger (2–4) || Parr (7–1) ||  || 4500 || 33–17 || 16–10
|- bgcolor="#ffbbbb"
| May 15 || #22 Georgia Tech || #11 || Davenport Field • Charlottesville, VA || 4–5 || Gorst (1–1) || Haseley (7–3) ||  || 4531 || 33–18 || 16–11
|- bgcolor="#bbbbbb"
| May 17 || Richmond || #9 || Davenport Field • Charlottesville, VA || colspan=7|Canceled
|- bgcolor="#bbffbb"
| May 19 ||  || #9 || Davenport Field • Charlottesville, VA || 8–3 || Jones (11–1) || Scheetz (5–6) || Doherty (2) || 3832 || 34–18 || 17–11
|- bgcolor="#bbffbb"
| May 20 || Virginia Tech || #9 || Davenport Field • Charlottesville, VA ||7–6||Doyle (2–5)||Kragel (2–4)||  ||3759||35–18||18–11
|- bgcolor="#bbffbb"
| May 21 || Virginia Tech || #9 || Davenport Field • Charlottesville, VA ||4–1||Haseley (8–3)||Woodcock (1–8)||  ||4367||36–18||19–11
|-

|- 
! style="background:#00214E;color:white;"| Post-Season
|-

|- bgcolor="#ffbbbb"
| May 26 || #28 Clemson|| #8 || Durham Bulls Athletic Park • Durham, NC || 5–4 ||Krall (9–1)|| Shambora (5–1)  ||  ||3259||36–19|| 0–1
|- bgcolor="#ffbbbb"
| May 27 ||Wake Forest|| #8 || Durham Bulls Athletic Park • Durham, NC ||10–9||Kelly (1–2)||Bettinger (2–5)||Craig (8)||3027||36–20||0–2
|- bgcolor="#bbffbb"
| May 28 || #3 Louisville|| #8 || Durham Bulls Athletic Park • Durham, NC ||7–2||Haseley (9–3)||Harrington (11–2)||  ||5188||37–20||1–2
|-

|- bgcolor="#bbffbb"
| June 3 ||  || #8 || Davenport Field • Charlottesville, VA  ||17–4|| Bettinger (3–5) || Powers (8–6) ||  || 3949 ||38–20||1–0
|- bgcolor="#ffbbbb"
| June 4 ||East Carolina|| #8 || Davenport Field • Charlottesville, VA ||6–8|| Ingle (6–3) || Doyle (2–6) ||  || 4628 ||38–21||1–1
|- bgcolor="#ffbbbb"
| June 5 ||William & Mary|| #8 || Davenport Field • Charlottesville, VA  ||4–5|| White (2–3) || Doyle (2–7)|| Gaouette (11) || 3649 ||38–22||1–2
|-

|-
| style="font-size:88%" | All rankings from Collegiate Baseball.

Rankings

Awards and honors
Connor Jones
 Baseball America Pre-season Third team All-American
 All-ACC first team
Pavin Smith
 Baseball America Pre-season Third team All-American
 All-ACC second team
Matt Thaiss
 All-ACC second team
 ACC Baseball Championship All-Tournament Team
Ernie Clement
 All-ACC third team
Daniel Pinero
 ACC Baseball Championship All-Tournament Team

References

Virginia Cavaliers
Virginia Cavaliers baseball seasons
Virginia
Virgin